The 1999–2000 Heineken Cup was the fifth edition of the Heineken Cup of rugby. Teams from France, Ireland, Italy, Wales, England and Scotland were divided into six pools of four and played home and away matches against each other. The pool winners and two best runners-up qualified for the knockout stages.

Teams

Pool stage
In the pool matches teams received
 2 points for a win
 1 points for a draw

Pool 1

Pool 2

Pool 3

Pool 4

Pool 5

Pool 6

Seeding

Knockout stage

Quarter-finals

Semi-finals

Final

 
1999–2000
1999–2000 in European rugby union
1999–2000 in English rugby union
1999–2000 in French rugby union
1999–2000 in Irish rugby union
1999–2000 in Italian rugby union
1999–2000 in Scottish rugby union
1999–2000 in Welsh rugby union